The Independent Republicans Group (RI) was a liberal parliamentary group in the French Senate.

History of the group under the Fifth Republic

References

External links
List of Historic members of the Independent Republicans Group

Parliamentary groups in France